The 1963 Navy Midshipmen football team represented the United States Naval Academy as an independent in the 1963 NCAA University Division football season. Led by fifth-year head coach Wayne Hardin, the Midshipmen finished the year with an overall record of 9–2 and a loss against Texas in the Cotton Bowl Classic.

Quarterback Roger Staubach won the Heisman Trophy and the Maxwell Award while leading the Midshipmen to a 9–1 regular season record and a final ranking of No. 2 in the nation. He led Navy to victory over their annual rivalry with Notre Dame, which would be the Midshipmen's last win over Notre Dame until 2007. In the Crab Bowl Classic, Navy defeated Maryland by a score of 42–7. There was talk of cancelling the 1963 Army-Navy game in the aftermath of the assassination of President John F. Kennedy, but his widow, Jacqueline, insisted that the game should be played. No. 2 Navy accepted an invitation to play in the 1964 Cotton Bowl Classic versus No. 1 Texas, the second No. 1 versus No. 2 bowl game in college football history.

Schedule

Roster

Team players in the NFL
 1964 NFL Draft

Awards and honors
 Roger Staubach – Heisman Trophy, Walter Camp Award

References

Navy
Navy Midshipmen football seasons
Lambert-Meadowlands Trophy seasons
Navy Midshipmen football